Maksym Koval may refer:

 Maksym Koval (footballer), Ukrainian football goalkeeper
 Maksym Koval (athlete), Ukrainian Paralympic athlete

See also:
 Maksym Kowal, Canadian soccer player